Connie Wong Ar-yan (born 3 April 1977) is a Hong Kong women's cricketer. She has captained the side, and has played domestic cricket for Western Fury in the Women's National Cricket League.

Career
Wong made her debut for Hong Kong in a 2007/08 series against Bangladesh; Wong scored 4 from 32 balls, and took 0/8 from 4 overs. She was part of the team that won the 2011 ACC Women’s Twenty20 Championship; in the final, Wong scored 18 in a second-wicket partnership of 36 with Neisha Pratt. Wong captained Hong Kong at the 2012 Asia Women’s Cricket Twenty 20 Cricket Tournament.

In 2012, Wong and Keenu Gill withdrew from the Hong Kong squad for the 2012 Asian Cricket Council Women's Twenty20 Asia Cup in protest of new eligibility rules that made Neisha Pratt ineligible to play for Hong Kong. Both players were subsequently banned from playing for a year.

References

External links
Cricinfo
CricketArchive

1977 births
Hong Kong women cricketers
Living people
Western Australia women cricketers
Cricketers at the 2010 Asian Games
Asian Games competitors for Hong Kong
Hong Kong expatriates in Australia